Sukumar Ranjan Ghosh (born 4 January 1952) is a Bangladesh Awami League politician and a former Jatiya Sangsad member representing the Munshiganj-1 constituency.

Early life
Ghosh was born on 4 January 1952. He graduated from college.

Career
Ghosh was elected to Parliament from Munshiganj-1 in 2008 and 2014 as a Bangladesh Awami League candidate. In August 2013, Mobarak Hossain Jihadi thrented Ghosh and demand 500,000 taka from him. Police arrested Jihadi in September 2014 from South Keraniganj, Dhaka. On 27 March 2017, 15 people were injured in a fight between supporters of Ghosh and supporters of Bangladesh Awami League leader Golam Sarwar Kabi.

References

1952 births
Living people
Awami League politicians
Bangladeshi Hindus
9th Jatiya Sangsad members
10th Jatiya Sangsad members
Place of birth missing (living people)